Mirkadim, also known as Hasha a breed of cattle native to Munshiganj District of Bangladesh. The cattle is considered "premium" in Bangladesh. The Mirkadim is white in colour with a pink hue.

History 
Nobles in Bengal used to give Mirkadim breed as gifts to their children.

References 

Beef cattle breeds
Cattle breeds originating in Bangladesh
Munshiganj District